Inonotus chrysomarginatus is a species of fungus in the family Hymenochaetaceae. It is distinguished by having an annual to perennial growth habit, pileate basidiocarps (with a yellowish margin), setal hyphae and hooked hymenial setae, and subglobose, yellowish, thick-walled cyanophilous basidiospores.

References

Further reading
Dai, Yu-Cheng, et al. "Wood-inhabiting fungi in southern China. 4. Polypores from Hainan Province." Annales Botanici Fennici. Vol. 48. No. 3. Finnish Zoological and Botanical Publishing Board, 2011.

External links
 

Fungal tree pathogens and diseases
chrysomarginatus
Fungi described in 2011